Rao Raja Kalyan Singh Bahadur (20 June 1886 at Deeppura - 5 November 1967 Jaipur) was the 11th Rao Raja of Sikar 1922/1967. 
He was the nephew of his predecessor, son of Thakur Dalip Singh, elder brother of Rao Raja Mado Singh Bahadur.

He was the last ruler of Sikar, famous for his love of magnanimous buildings, palaces, temples, and ponds. He constructed the clock tower as well as the Kalyan Hospital and college.

He married a daughter of Thakur Madho Singh of Sirana in Ajmer.

References

People from Sikar
20th-century Indian monarchs
1886 births
1967 deaths